The S29 is a regional railway line of the Zürich S-Bahn on the ZVV (Zürich transportation network), in the cantons of Zürich, Thurgau and Schaffhausen.

Route 

 

Trains usually run every 30 minutes (as of 2023) and a journey takes 46 minutes.

Alternative connections from Winterthur to Stein am Rhein are:

Stations
 Winterthur
 Oberwinterthur
 Winterthur Wallrüti
 Reutlingen
 Seuzach
 Dinhard
 Thalheim-Altikon
 Ossingen
 Stammheim
 Etzwilen
 Stein am Rhein

Rolling stock 
The S29 service is operated with THURBO rolling stock (Stadler GTW units).

See also 

 Rail transport in Switzerland
 Trams in Zürich

References 

 ZVV official website: Routes & zones

Zürich S-Bahn lines
Transport in the canton of Zürich
Canton of Schaffhausen